Ido is a constructed language.

Ido or IDO may refer to:

Places
 Ido, Nigeria
 Ido-Osi, in Ekiti State, Nigeria
 Ido Ekiti
 Ido Station, a railway station in Kagawa, Japan

Organizations
 International Dance Organization
 İDO, a ferry boat company in Istanbul, Turkey

Other uses
 Ido (name), a given name and a surname, including a list of people with the name
 Indoleamine 2,3-dioxygenase, an enzyme 
 Ido (film), a 2005 film by Kei Fujiwara

See also

 Iddo (disambiguation)
 ID-0, a Japanese anime series